Moon River is an album by Lawrence Welk and His Orchestra. It was released in 1961 on the Dot label (catalog no. DLP-25412).

The album debuted on Billboard magazine's popular albums chart on January 13, 1962, reached the No. 4 spot, and remained on that chart for 43 weeks

AllMusic gave the album a rating of four stars. Reviewer Greg Adams praised the album's "sweeping melodies" and noted that the arrangements were "more serious in tone than Welk's usual lighthearted fare."

Track listing

Side 1
 "Moon River" (Henry Mancini, Johnny Mercer) [2:35]
 "Tonight" (Leonard Bernstein) [2:13]
 "Exodus" (Ernest Gold) [3:03]
 "Around the World" (Victor Young, Harold Adamson) [2:24]
 "The Sound of Music" (Rodgers and Hammerstein) [2:50]
 "Till There Was You" (Meredith Wilson) [2:40]

Side 2
 "I Could Have Danced All Night" (Lerner & Loewe) [2:40]
 "You Gave Me Wings" (C. Coveny) [2:36]
 "Some Enchanted Evening" (Rodgers and Hammerstein) [3:05]
 "Wish You Were Here" (Harold Rome) [2:25]
 "Love Is a Many-Splendored Thing" (Phil Francis Webster, Sammy Fain) [2:36]
 "You'll Never walk Alone" (Rodgers and Hammerstein) [2:11]

References

1961 albums
Dot Records albums
Lawrence Welk albums